The second competition weekend of the 2019–20 ISU Speed Skating World Cup was held at the Ice Arena in Tomaszów Mazowiecki, Poland, from Friday, 22 November, until Sunday, 24 November 2019.

Medal summary

Men's events

 In mass start, race points are accumulated during the race based on results of the intermediate sprints and the final sprint. The skater with most race points is the winner.

Women's events

 In mass start, race points are accumulated during the race based on results of the intermediate sprints and the final sprint. The skater with most race points is the winner.

References

2
ISU World Cup, 2019-20, 2
2019 in Polish sport
ISU
Sport in Tomaszów Mazowiecki